HMS Wanderer was a 16-gun brig-sloop of the Royal Navy. The ship was part of the West Africa Squadron stationed at Sierra Leone.

In October 1835 HMS Wanderer set sail from Portsmouth for Rio de Janeiro

In 1839 Joseph Denman was appointed to the command of HMS Wanderer.

In 1842 Stephen Grenville Fremantle, brother of Admiral Charles Fremantle was captain.

References

External links
 

1835 ships
Ships of the West Africa Squadron